Microsoft Pascal is a discontinued implementation of the Pascal programming language developed by the Microsoft Corporation for compiling programs for running on its MS-DOS and Xenix operating systems and, in later versions, on OS/2 (like many other Microsoft programming tools, albeit they are only capable of generating 16-bit programs for the latter).

Overview
Microsoft Pascal version 1.0 was released in 1980.  The last version of Microsoft Pascal to be released was version 4.0 in 1988, when Microsoft Pascal was superseded by Microsoft QuickPascal, a cheaper development tool that Microsoft produced in order to compete with Borland's Turbo Pascal.

Unlike the ISO compliant Microsoft Pascal product, QuickPascal went after the ultimate compatibility with Turbo Pascal. This included not only source-level compatibility, but rather complete binary compatibility with widely available unit libraries for the competitor's compiler. To achieve this level of compatibility, QuickPascal moved away from the common file format (OBJ) and tool set (LINK, LIB) shared by Microsoft's other compilers.

References

Notes

 Jon Udell, Clash of the Object-Oriented Pascals, BYTE, July, 1989.
 M.I.Trofimov, The End of Pascal?, BYTE, March, 1990, p. 36.

Pascal
Pascal programming language family